Hico may stand for:

 Hico, Kentucky 
 Hico, Missouri
 Hico, Texas
 Hico, West Virginia
 HiCo stands for high-coercivity, a variety of magnetic stripe.
 The Hyperspectral Imager for the Coastal Ocean (HICO), a satellite sensor mounted on the International Space Station 2009-2014.